Ali Kafashian (born on 6 August 1954 in Nain) is an Iranian businessman, economist, a retired athlete and former president of the Football Federation Islamic Republic of Iran, a position he had held from 1 March 2008 to 7 May 2016. As of May 2015, he also serves as one of five Vice presidents at the Asian Football Confederation (AFC).

He previously served as Secretary General of Iran's National Olympic Committee from 2004 until 2008. Kaffashian was elected as President of Iranian Football Federation in 2008, in a race with no other contenders, and was re-elected in March 2012, after he defeated Hossein Gharib. He is also an employee of Central Bank of Iran.

Suspension 
In June 2019, Ali Kafashian and Abbas Torabian were suspended by the Iranian Football Federation's Ethic Committee for financial corruption.

References

External links

 on Kafashian

1954 births
Living people
Association football executives
People from Nain, Iran
Iranian sports executives and administrators
Presidents of Iranian Football Federation